Hala Zawati is a Jordanian politician. , she held the position of Minister of Energy and Mineral Resources in Bisher Al-Khasawneh's Cabinet led by Prime Minister Bisher Al-Khasawneh. She previously served in this position in Omar Razzaz's cabinet led by Prime Minister Omar Razzaz (from 14 June 2018 till 12 October 2020).

Previously, she served as President of the Jordan Strategy Forum. She provided numerous consultations on energy affairs for the House of Representatives, companies in Jordan and companies abroad in the programs of the US Agency for Development, the German Development Agency, the Japanese Development Agency, the European Union and the United Nations Development Program.

Educational Qualifications 

 Bachelor's degree in Electrical Engineering from the University of Jordan in 1987
 Graduate Management Degree from Universidade de Empresa in Spain in 2007
 Certificate in Leadership and Development from Harvard, Duke and Thunderbird
 Recipient of the Eisenhower Fellowship.
 2015 Middle East Energy Manager of the Year from the American Society of Energy Engineers

Positions 

 Executive Director of the Jordan Strategy Forum.
 Executive Director of Edama Association for Energy, Water and Environment
 CEO of Advanced Computer Services Company
 Energy consultant for Umniah company
 King Abdullah II Fund for Development
 Al Ahli Bank and Bank of Jordan
 Minister of Energy and Mineral Resources

Memberships 

 Founding member of the Edama Association for Energy, Water and Environment
 Member of the Board of Directors of the Amman Stock Exchange Company
 Member of the Board of Trustees of the Elia Naqel Foundation
 Member of the charitable society of Al Khayr wa Alata'.
 Member of the Jordanian Women's Renaissance Association.

References 

Living people
Year of birth missing (living people)
Place of birth missing (living people)
Energy ministers of Jordan
Women government ministers of Jordan
21st-century Jordanian women politicians
21st-century Jordanian politicians